Amado Arana Mendívil (1879 – after 1903) was a Spanish footballer who played as a defender for Athletic Club. He was one of the co-founders of Athletic Club in 1901 and was part of the team that won the 1902 Copa de la Coronación, the first national championship disputed in Spain, and he was then part of the team that won the 1903 Copa del Rey, the first official national championship.

Biography
Together with his brothers Luis, Mario and José María he was one of the first pioneers of football in Bilbao. On 5 September 1901, he was one of the 33 members who signed the documents that officially established the Athletic Club at the historic meeting in Café García. He was then one of the first football players of the newly created Basque team, with whom he played several friendly matches against city rivals Bilbao Football Club) in the Hippodrome of Lamiako.

In 1902, the two rivals agreed to join the best players of each club to face the Bordeaux-based side Burdigala. This temporary merge became known as Club Bizcaya and Larrañaga ousted Bilbao FC's defenders to be part of the first-ever line-up of the Bizcaya team that faced Burdigala on 9 March, contributing to a clean-sheet in an 0–2 win in France. Three weeks later, on 31 March 1902, he was again in Bizcaya's starting XI for the return fixture at Lamiako, the first visit by a foreign team to Bilbao, helping his side to a 7–0 win over the French side. 

Together with Juan Astorquia, Armand Cazeaux, William Dyer and Walter Evans, he was part of the Bizcaya team that won the first national championship disputed in Spain, 1902 Copa de la Coronación, the forerunner for the Copa del Rey. He was also part of the Athletic team that won the 1903 Copa del Rey, featuring in the final alongside the likes of Alejandro de la Sota, and club founders Juan Astorquia and Eduardo Montejo. Cockram was at the heart of a 3–2 comeback win over Madrid FC (now known as Real Madrid) in the final. He was also part of the team that won the 1904 Copa del Rey, which Athletic won without playing a single match since their opponents failed to turn up.

Honours
Club Bizcaya
Copa de la Coronación: 1902

Athletic Club
Copa del Rey: 1903 and 1904

References

1879 births
Year of death missing
Spanish footballers
Athletic Bilbao footballers
Association football defenders
Footballers from Bilbao